National Route 311 is a national highway of Japan connecting Owase, Mie and Kamitonda, Wakayama in Japan, with a total length of 147.4 km (91.59 mi).

References

National highways in Japan
Roads in Mie Prefecture
Roads in Nara Prefecture
Roads in Wakayama Prefecture